Vanlalzuidika Chhakchhuak (born 17 March 1998), also known as Zuidika, is an Indian professional footballer who plays as a defender for I-League club Mohammedan.

Club career

Chhinga Veng
In 2018, Zuidika sign first senior contract with the current Mizoram Premier League and then I-League 2nd Division club Chhinga Veng. He made 9 appearances for the club during the 2018–19 I-League 2nd Division. Zuidika was a nominee for the best defender award in the 2018–19 Mizoram Premier League. After the 2019–20 Mizoram Premier League, Zuidika left the club for Aizawl.

Aizawl
On 29 August 2020, it was announced that Zuidika has signed with the I-League club Aizawl for the 2020–21 I-League season. He made his debut on 9 January 2021 against RoundGlass Punjab, which they lost 1–0 at full-time. He made a total of 11 appearances for the club throughout his debut campaign.

Career statistics

Club

References

External links 
 
Vanlalzuidika Chhakchhuak at ESPN

1998 births
Living people
People from Mizoram
Indian footballers
I-League players
Aizawl FC players
Association football defenders
I-League 2nd Division players
Mizoram Premier League players
Chhinga Veng FC players
Footballers from Mizoram
Sudeva Delhi FC players
Mohammedan SC (Kolkata) players